{{Infobox Boxingmatch
| Fight Name    = Canelo Álvarez vs. Amir Khan
| fight date    = May 7, 2016
| image         = 
| location      = T-Mobile Arena, Las Vegas, Nevada, U.S.
| titles        = WBC and The Ring middleweight titles
| fighter1      = Canelo Álvarez
| nickname1     = Canelo("Cinnamon")
| record1       = 46–1–1 (32 KO)
| hometown1     = Guadalajara, Jalisco, Mexico
| height1       = 5 ft 9 in
| weight1       = 155 lbs
| recognition1  = WBC and The Ring middleweight champion[[The Ring (magazine)|The Ring]] No. 7 ranked pound-for-pound fighter2-division world champion
| fighter2      = Amir Khan 
| nickname2     = King
| record2       = 31–3 (19 KO)
| hometown2     = Bolton, United Kingdom
| height2       = 5 ft 10 in
| weight2       = 155 lbs
| recognition2  = WBC Silver welterweight championFormer unified light welterweight champion
| result        =Álvarez wins via 6th-round KO 
}}
Canelo Álvarez vs. Amir Khan, was a professional boxing fight which took place on May 7, 2016, and was contested for the WBC, The Ring magazine and lineal middleweight titles. It was the first major sporting event to be held at the T-Mobile Arena in Las Vegas.

The fight was Canelo Álvarez's first defense as the WBC and The Ring'' middleweight champion, and Amir Khan's first fight at middleweight after moving up two weight divisions from welterweight. A catchweight of 155 lb was in effect, at which Álvarez had fought for his previous four fights. The fight was won by Álvarez, who scored a sixth-round knockout of Khan to retain his titles.

Broadcast
The bout was on HBO PPV in the US, and on BoxNation in the UK. It was also shown by Fathom Events at nearly 200 select movie theaters across the United States. In Mexico, the fight was aired on TV Azteca. In Mexico and Latin America, the fight was aired on the Space channel.

Fight details

Round by round 
Round 1

Khan tossed out several jabs to open the fight, but failed to connect. A hard right cross to the head snapped Álvarez’s head back, but  appeared largely unaffected. Álvarez responded with a right to the ribs, and Khan responded with a flurry of jabs and a right to the head. Álvarez missed with a powerful right hook, but Khan was out of position to counter. Khan walked into a short left hook just as his own left missed, but did not appear hurt. Khan blocked Álvarez's left hook with a minute left. Khan opened up with a flurry of three punches to the head, all of which missed. Khan maintained a high tempo for the remainder of the round.

Round 2

Álvarez stormed out of his corner, but missed with a sweeping left-right upstairs. Álvarez missed another hard right hook, causing him to stumble and Khan countered with a quick shot. Álvarez remained aggressive, walking after his opponent and throwing digs to the body. Both fighters missed during an exchange in the center of the ring before settling in with jabs. Khan landed a right-left up top but Álvarez walked through it. Khan threw four jabs to the head and body. With 10 seconds left, Álvarez swallowed a slick left-right, giving Khan the round.

Round 3

Khan remained mobile, forcing Álvarez to lunge in and miss many early shots. Khan got hit with a short left, but was left unfazed. Khan threw a hard left-right followed by a pair of jabs, then landed a sweeping left hook to the head. Álvarez did not appear hurt by the shots, but their speed appeared to be giving him issues. Khan remained just out of reach of another hard left hook from Álvarez. Khan threw a multi-punch flurry to the face, but Álvarez continued to walk through the attacks. Álvarez threw a hard right to the body, but Khan quickly countered upstairs with a forceful right and then a short left.

Round 4

A hard right to the face by Khan caught Álvarez off guard, and the fighters clinched. In the grip, Álvarez slammed a left to the ribs, forcing Khan to back off. Khan landed another right, but Álvarez landed a right of his own to the body. Khan landed a triple jab to Álvarez. Álvarez missed a right, and was subsequently cracked by a forceful overhand left. Nevertheless, he did not appear to be dazed. Khan missed a powerful right-left to the head as Álvarez turned with both shots. Álvarez's right eye began to swell late in the round. Álvarez slammed another right to the body as the round came to a close.

Round 5

Álvarez threw a short left to the head early, but Khan shook it off. Álvarez moved fervently, making Álvarez chase after him. Álvarez landed a right to the body, but was quickly countered by a left up top. Álvarez threw some jabs after taking a shot to the ribs a minute into the round. Álvarez caught Khan with a right, but Khan partially blocked it against the ropes. Khan landed a jab then ducked under a left hook, but Álvarez was out of position to land. Álvarez threw a three-punch combo, but  missed during an exchange at the bell.

Round 6

Both fighters took turns missing meager jabs early before Khan landed an errant left hook to Álvarez's ear. Álvarez returned fire with a right to the hip. Álvarez answered Khan's jab with a left hook. Khan appeared slightly dazed, and the fight changed pace, with Álvarez taking control. With a loss in maneuverability, Khan sought to establish a buffer zone with jabs. Álvarez used the opportunity to land a couple of body shots to Khan, slowing his movement. Khan's head seemed to be clearing, but he had not regained the body movement which protected him so well earlier in the bout. Álvarez feinted a body jab as a cover to load a right hook, but Khan parried the jab with both hands. The jab was withdrawn and Khan was left off balance with both hands down. Álvarez feinted another jab and landed an overhand right, dropping Khan unconscious. Bayless did not count as the ringside staff, including doctors, stormed the ring.

Analysis 
Alvarez was ahead on two scorecards, 49–46 and 48–47. Khan was ahead 48–47 on the third scorecard. ESPN.com had Khan ahead 48–47.

Reception 
The fight produced $7,417,350 from the live gate, according to figures released by the Nevada State Athletic Commission. This came from 13,072 sold tickets. The gross made it the 34th highest grossing boxing event in Nevada history. On pay-per-view, the fight sold an estimated 600,000 PPV buys, but HBO and Golden Boy promotions refused to release the official totals. The fight grossed at least $ in pay-per-view revenue, giving the event a combined live-gate and pay-per-view revenue of at least $.

In addition to 600,000 PPV buys, the fight drew a replay audience of 1.005million viewers on HBO, giving a total audience of million viewers on HBO. In Mexico, the fight drew a live audience of 3.3million viewers on Azteca 7, making it the year's fourth most-watched live sporting event in Mexico up until May 2016. The fight drew a total audience of 15.4million viewers on TV Azteca in Mexico. Combined, the fight had a total of million viewers in the United States and Mexico.

Álvarez's potential earnings from the fight was about $15-20 million. Amir Khan's earnings from the fight was an estimated $13.1million (£9million), the highest for a British boxer since Wladimir Klitschko vs. David Haye in 2011.

Fight card
The fight card included the following fights:

Fight purses
Guaranteed Base Purses
 Canelo Álvarez ($3,000,000) vs. Amir Khan ($2,000,000)
 David Lemieux ($200,000) vs. Glen Tapia ($150,000)
 Mauricio Herrera ($175,000) vs. Frankie Gomez ($90,000)
 Curtis Stevens ($65,000) vs. Patrick Teixeira ($50,000)

Press conferences
The fight had international press conferences in three cities:

February 29, 2016 — Park Plaza Riverbank, London, UK
March 1, 2016 — Hard Rock Cafe, New York City, New York, US
March 2, 2016 — Five Towers Stage, Los Angeles, California, US

International broadcasting

References

Khan
2016 in boxing
Boxing on HBO
Golden Boy Promotions
2016 in sports in Nevada
Boxing in Las Vegas
May 2016 sports events in the United States
Amir Khan (boxer)